After.Life is a 2009 American psychological horror-thriller film directed by Agnieszka Wójtowicz-Vosloo from her original screenplay. It stars Liam Neeson, Christina Ricci, and Justin Long.

Plot
Eliot Deacon (Liam Neeson) owns a funeral home and talks softly to the corpses he prepares for burial. Middle school teacher Anna Taylor (Christina Ricci) attends the funeral of her piano teacher where she meets Eliot. That night Anna argues with her boyfriend Paul (Justin Long) at a restaurant. She drives off in a state of distress, and has a traffic accident. She awakens on an embalming table in the funeral home to find the funeral director, Eliot, cutting off her clothes and telling her she has died. He tells Anna he has a gift and that he can hear the dead. Eliot has a collection of photographs of corpses whom he has helped "make the transition". Eliot injects Anna regularly with a fictional drug called hydronium bromide to "relax the muscles and keep rigor mortis from setting in."

Paul asks to see Anna's body but Eliot does not allow it on the grounds he is not family. Anna unsuccessfully attempts to escape several times. Eliot tells her she must let go of life as she had not really been living anyway. Eventually, Anna escapes and finds a room with a phone where she reaches Paul, who hangs up thinking it's a prank. Anna comes to believe she has actually died when Eliot lets her see her corpse-like self in a mirror. One of Anna's students sees her and alerts Paul, who begins to suspect she is still alive.

Anna's student Jack (Chandler Canterbury) visits the funeral home and Eliot tells him that they share a gift, the same as Jesus, who raised Lazarus, and he offers to teach the boy more. The boy accepts and is later seen burying a living chick in a box.

During the final preparation for the funeral, Anna asks to see herself one last time. Eliot holds up a small mirror, and while she stares at herself she notices her breath condensing on the glass and accuses Eliot of having lied to her about her being dead. Eliot injects her one last time and she slips into unconsciousness. At the funeral, Paul places the engagement ring he intended to give her the night of the crash on her finger.

After the funeral, Paul drinks heavily and behaves aggressively with Eliot, who seems to taunt him and encourage him to see for himself that Anna is really dead, telling him there is not much time. Meanwhile, Anna is shown awakening to the sound of earth being shoveled onto her casket. She cries out and desperately scratches the satin lining of the lid. Driving under the influence of alcohol, Paul rushes to the cemetery. They are shown embracing and Anna tells Paul she has always loved him. Paul asks what the odd sound is that he hears, and Anna explains it is the sound of Eliot's gloves and scissors on the table as he prepares Paul's body. A moment later, he finds himself in the funeral home prep room with Eliot standing over him preparing his body as he did Anna's. Eliot tells him that he never made it to the cemetery due to a car accident which killed him. Paul protests that he is alive until the moment Eliot inserts an embalming trocar deep into his torso.

Cast
 Christina Ricci as Anna Taylor
 Liam Neeson as Eliot Deacon
 Justin Long as Paul Coleman
 Josh Charles as Tom Peterson
 Celia Weston as Beatrice Taylor
 Chandler Canterbury as Jack
 Rosemary Murphy as Mrs. Whitehall
 Shuler Hensley as Vincent Miller
 Malachy McCourt as Father Graham
 Alice Drummond as Mrs. Hutton

Production
After.Life completed filming in New York at the end of December 2008 with Bill Perkins and Celine Rattray as producers. Galt Niederhoffer and Pam Hirsch are executive producing for Plum Pictures with Edwin Marshall and James Swisher executive producing for Harbor Light. Scenes were filmed in Lynbrook, New York in early December 2008.

Release
After.Life premiered at the AFI Film Festival in Los Angeles on November 7, 2009. Anchor Bay Entertainment, a division of Overture Films, has acquired theatrical rights for the U.S. and the U.K. The film received an R-rating for the multiple nude scenes with Christina Ricci and was released on 9 April 2010 in a limited release. Anchor Bay released the DVD and Blu-ray on 3 August 2010.

Critical reception
After.Life was not well-received by critics. Review aggregate Rotten Tomatoes reports that 25% of 56 critics have given the film a positive review, holding an average score of 4.5/10. According to the website, the film's critical consensus is, "It has an interesting premise and admirable ambitions, but After.Life fails to deliver enough twists or thrills to sustain its creepy atmosphere." Review aggregate Metacritic has given the film a weighted score of 36/100 based on 21 reviews, indicating "generally unfavorable reviews". DreadCentral rated the film 2.5/5 stars and called it "a competent but disappointing thriller." Bloody Disgusting rated it 3/5 stars and described it as "a plodding reflection on mortality disguised as a psychological thriller". In a negative review for The New York Times, Manohla Dargis wrote that "the few good ideas are inevitably thwarted by the filmmaking". James Berardinelli rated the film 3/4. Berardinelli wrote that the film "has flaws aplenty" but it is arresting and unsettling.

References

External links
  
 
 

2009 films
2009 horror films
2000s horror thriller films
2000s psychological drama films
2000s psychological horror films
2009 psychological thriller films
2000s thriller drama films
American horror thriller films
American psychological drama films
American psychological horror films
American psychological thriller films
American thriller drama films
Films about educators
Films set in New York City
Films shot in New York (state)
Funeral homes in fiction
American horror drama films
Films scored by Paul Haslinger
2009 drama films
2000s English-language films
2000s American films